In Nigeria, hunger is one of the major issues that affect the citizens. Nigeria is the most populous country in Africa; a home for more than 206 million people. In Nigeria, 40% (82 million people) of the country lives below the International Poverty Line of $1.90 daily, whilst another 25% are vulnerable. It was ranked second poorest in food affordability globally by the Institute of Development Studies, United Kingdom.  

There are many consequences of hunger, namely malnutrition, undernutrition, and child wasting. According to UNICEF, there are three main outcomes: underweight at 36.4%, stunting at 41.3%, wasting at 15.6%.

Causes
Factors that contribute to the hunger over various states of Nigeria are due to insecurity, and environmental factors such as habitat destruction, economic challenges, and devastating effects of COVID-19.

Facts
 Nigeria is a country short of food i.e.shortage of food.

2. A child in the northern region of Nigeria experiences malnutrition four times more than a child in the southern region.

Historical data

Global Hunger Index
The Global Hunger Index (GHI) is a means of calculating and tracing hunger and undernutrition at global, regional, and national levels.

GHI Severity Scale

Component Indicators of GHI

 The proportion of the undernourished as a percentage of the population;
 The proportion of children under the age of five suffering from wasting, a sign of acute undernutrition;
 The proportion of children under the age of five suffering from stunting, a sign of chronic undernutrition;  and
 The mortality rate of children.

References

N
Demographics of Nigeria